New Year's Evil is a 1980 American slasher film written and directed by Emmett Alston, co-written by Leonard Neubauer, and starring Kip Niven, Roz Kelly, and Chris Wallace. The plot follows a Los Angeles punk rock and new wave show host who receives a series of phone calls during a televised New Year's Eve bash from a killer warning of impending murders that he plans to exact as the New Year dawns on each time zone.

Plot 
One New Year's Eve, popular punk rock/new wave DJ Diane Sullivan (known as "Blaze" among her fans) is hosting a late-night countdown celebration of music and partying, televised live from a Hollywood hotel and simulcast on local radio. All is going well until Diane receives a phone call from an odd-sounding stranger, who claims his name is Evil. He announces his intention to murder one "naughty girl" at the stroke of midnight in each US time zone; he warns that Diane, located in the Pacific Time Zone, will be the last victim. Meanwhile, Diane's son Derek arrives at the studio, but is mostly ignored by his mother; he begins behaving erratically throughout the night as he watches the show on television.

The studio crew takes safety measures and heightens security, but a string of murders begins to occur across Los Angeles; a nurse at a sanitarium is found dead shortly after midnight strikes in the Eastern Time Zone, and two women are found dead near a liquor store after midnight in the Central Time Zone. The killer uses a radio/cassette recorder to tape the sounds of his victims as he murders them and calls back the station each time, replaying the tapes over the phone to prove that he is serious. While the killer searches for a victim to kill for the stroke of midnight in the Mountain Time Zone, he inadvertently angers a gang of bikers, who chase him into a drive-in theater. He murders one of the bikers, steals a couple's car to avoid being recognized, and drives off with the girl still in the backseat, intending to make her his next victim, but she manages to escape.

Eventually the killer manages to sneak into the hotel, which by now has been completely locked down by the police, and is revealed to be Diane's husband, Richard, who was previously thought to be too busy to attend. After knocking Diane out, he castigates her over her treatment of their son, perceiving her and other women's treatment of him as a slight on his character. He reveals his intention to kill her by chaining her to an elevator and forcing it to ride "all the way up, then all the way down," having hacked the elevator controls. While he is doing this, the police, who have been alerted to his presence, locate him. A brief firefight ensues and the elevator controls are damaged, stopping the elevator and saving Diane. Richard flees to the rooftop, putting on the mask he had used to conceal himself while entering the building. Cornered by the police, he proceeds to jump to his death; a devastated Derek weeps over his body.

The injured Diane is loaded into an ambulance, but Derek is revealed to be the driver, having taken his dead father's mask and murdered the real driver. The ambulance drives off, leaving Diane's fate unknown, as a radio announcer in Honolulu is heard announcing the stroke of midnight in the Hawaii–Aleutian Time Zone.

Cast 

 Roz Kelly as Diane "Blaze" Sullivan
 Kip Niven as Richard Sullivan
 Chris Wallace as Lieutenant Ed Clayton
 Grant Cramer as Derek Sullivan
 Louisa Moritz as Sally
 Jed Mills as Ernie Moffet
 Taaffe O'Connell as Jane
 Jon Greene as Sergeant Greene
 Teri Copley as Teenage Girl
 Anita Crane as Lisa
 Jennie Anderson as Nurse Robbie
 Alicia Dhanifu as Yvonne
 Wendy-Sue Rosloff as Make-up Girl
 John London as Floor Manager
 John Alderman as Doctor Reed
 Michael Frost as Larry

Filming
Filming began in Los Angeles, California, on 15 October 1980.

Release
New Year's Evil was theatrically released in the United States on December 19, 1980, by Cannon Film Distributors. It rarely screened theatrically again until the latter half of the 2000s, most prominently at Quentin Tarantino's New Beverly Cinema in Los Angeles, California, most recently on December 29, 2018. 

New Year's Evil was released on DVD through on-demand pressings from Metro-Goldwyn-Mayer's Limited Edition Collection on June 28, 2012. Scream Factory, a subsidiary of Shout! Factory, released the film on Blu-ray on February 24, 2015.

Reception
On the review aggregator website Rotten Tomatoes, New Year's Evil has an approval rating of 14%, based on seven reviews. On Metacritic the film has a weighted average score of 33 out of 100, based on 4 critics, indicating "generally unfavorable reviews". Roger Ebert of the Chicago Sun-Times gave the film a 1½ and wrote, "New Year's Evil is an endangered species - a plain, old-fashioned, gory thriller. It is not very good. It is sometimes unpleasantly bloody. The plot is dumb and the twist at the end has been borrowed from hundreds if not thousands of other movies. But as thrillers go these days, New Year's Evil is a throwback to an older and simpler tradition, one that flourished way back in the dimly remembered past, before 1978". Gene Siskel gave the film zero stars out of four, calling it "a hideously ugly motion picture". Variety wrote: "The true horror of New Year's Evil is the endless musical numbers by punk rockers and shots of their dancing fans. Amongst that, the bloody killings seem a welcome relief". Among retrospective reviews, Eric Vespe of Ain't It Cool News said, "New Year's Evil falls into that 'didn't love it, didn't hate it' gray area of mediocrity that doesn’t exactly inspire any kind of passion one way or the other. On the one hand it's too goofy and amateurish to really be creeped out by and on the other it's not fun enough to rally behind". Dread Central's Matt Serafini concluded: "This isn't worth your time if you're looking for a horror film to deliver in scares or suspense, but as a late night horror fix, it's ideal. What New Year's Evil lacks in scares it makes up for in pure entertainment. And really, that's all you can ask for". The film was labeled "another routine mad-slasher film" and a "strictly paint-by-numbers effort" by TV Guide.

Soundtrack and theme song 
W. Michael Lewis and Laurin Rinder composed the film soundtrack and produced the title track's recording, "New Year's Evil".

New Year's Evil song

Over the years the title song, like the movie, has developed a cult following. It has appeared in horror movies "best songs of" playlists, and the film has been the topic of numerous podcasts in which the song is a point of discussion.

The song was written by Roxanne Seeman and Eddie del Barrio.

 
The filmmakers wanted an original title and theme song to be played live by a punk band being featured in the film. Requests for a song were sent to several writers. The music supervisor was Rex Devereaux. Del Barrio and Seeman submitted their original song, "New Year's Evil", for the spec submission. Del Barrio wrote chords and melody on a synthesizer and gave a rough mixdown to Seeman to write the lyrics. Seeman wrote the lyrics to visually reflect the storyline:

The final demo recording with Seeman's lyrics was sung by session singer Gary Falcone and recorded on del Barrio's 4-track machine.

The movie track was recorded at Salty Dog Studios, Los Angeles, by Seattle rock band Shadow: Cliff White on guitar, Ray Leonard on bass, David Kesterson vocals, Art Bennett on drums, and J.P Pakalenka vocals and guitar. The recording was produced by the soundtrack's composers, W. Michael Lewis and Laurin Rinder. Shadow also performed the song on-camera

 as a punk rock band. The song plays at the opening of the movie and repeatedly throughout.

The recorded studio version also appears in the film. This version was pressed as a 7" vinyl 45 rpm single. Promotional singles were sent to radio stations throughout the US. A full soundtrack record is announced in the closing credits of the film, but has not materialized. In March 2020, MGM released the song on digital streaming platforms.

Track listing

A      New Year's Evil          2:32

B      Simon Bar Sinister     2:50

TV shows
 An episode of Elvira's Movie Macabre featured the full-length film New Year's Evil.

Other versions
Sister Midnight, a project by Steven Darrow of covers featuring different vocalists from all genres of rock from around the world, released a cover version of "New Year's Evil" on December 31, 2017, as the first recording. Derek "Dirty D" Christiansen is the vocalist.

The Angelas, an American alternative rock band from Nebraska formed by Alice Vitale and Natalie Regoli, released an instrumental version of "New Year's Evil" on October 1, 1989, on their second album of horror movie soundtrack covers.

Critical reception
Roger Ebert wrote in his review of the film: ""New Year's Evil" has music as its gimmick. The movie takes place on New Year's Eve, during a national TV show obviously inspired by "Midnight Special". The bands are second-rate punk rock groups (Made In Japan, Shadow). The hostess (Roz Kelly) is taking votes over the air for the new wave song of the year".

New Year's Evil has become a cult horror film with a preponderance of podcasts and reviews of the film, the song New Year's Evil and the music soundtrack:

Dreadcentral.com wrote: "Much of the music comes from an actual band named Shadow. The odd thing about Shadow is that their music sounds far more like a Seventies metal band than the Eighties punk rock and new wave the film promotes. Ah, who cares? It's 1980 and the top act on a New Year's countdown show isn't Manilow, The Gap Band, or The Oak Ridge Boys. "New Year's Evil" by Shadow it is".

dailydot.com wrote: "First off, this movie features the best New Year's Eve song ever made. Like the opening to Friday the 13th Part III, it's just one of those rare original recordings for low-budget horror film that's a complete gem, and it should be an American staple of New Year's Eve celebrations".

filmfracture.com wrote: "Of course, no rock and roll horror movie is complete without the music. The rock in New Year's Evil is supplied by two very real bands – Made in Japan and Shadow. Neither could really be called new wave or punk bands (Made in Japan is more of a The Knack-y power pop band and Shadow borders on 70's heavy metal), but both are obviously from the time period in which the film takes place. The theme song, done by Shadow and appropriately called "New Year's Evil", is incredibly infectious and plays over both the opening and closing credits as well as once during the course of the film. As if the song wasn't catchy enough, hearing it three times in ninety minutes means that there is no way that this song will not get stuck in the viewer's head. The incidental and mood music (composed by W. Michael Lewis and Laurin Rinder, who also scored a handful of episodes of "In Search Of…") is fairly typical Moog synthesizer suspense and stinger fare, but it works well in the context of the new wave slasher film.  Between the rock and roll soundtrack and the electronic music score, New Year’s Evil’s music is one of the more memorable elements of the film".

crypticrock.com: "...Blaze starts answering phones to talk to people calling in to vote for their favorite Rock songs, and she gets a call from a Bruce Jenner-haired guy (Niven) calling himself Eeeeevil. He uses a voice disguiser that makes him sound like a Jim Henson creation, but seriously tells her he is going to kill a "Naughty Girl" every time the clock strikes midnight in the different times zones across the country. Blaze is freaked out but gains enough composure to introduce the live band, Shadow, who play the most annoying New Year's Eve song ever".

geekscape.net: "The 12 Best Heavy Metal Songs From Horror Movies...I spent close to a decade playing in metal bands, but my earliest experiences with the genre were thanks to 80s horror movies. It was a golden age for both heavy metal and over-the-top horror cheese; I credit much of my personal growth to those countless nights watching people with questionable morals bleed out as some Aquanetted guy in pleather pants screeched on about how rock and roll will never die. If you're like me, horror and heavy metal are two sides of the same coin, so before you scream "Satanic Panic", let's burn through a definitive list of the very best heavy metal songs to slay to.

12 Shadow – New Years Evil theme (New Years Evil)..."

liberaldead.com by Jimmy Terror It Came From 1980x New Year's Evil on New Year's Eve!!! 31 December 2012: "W. Michael Lewis and Laurin Rinder created the original music for the picture. It's not punk. It's new wave...Still I love the soundtrack. I love it so much that I had the little collective known as Hacktivision of which I am a member create an 8 bit version of the theme music to be used in a future 8 bit faux video game (next year). The song itself will be available shortly on DOCTERROR.COM".  Here's a track listing:

 "New Year's Evil" - Written by Roxanne Seeman & Eduardo del Barrio
 "When I Wake Up" - Written by John Pakalenka
 "Simon Bar Sinister" - Written by Clifford White & Ray Leonard
 "Temper Tantrum" - Written by Ray Leonard
 "Headwind" - Written by Clifford White
 "Cold Hearted Lover" - Written by Clifford White
 "Auld Lang Syne"
 "Dumb Blondes"
 "The Cooler"
 "Suicide Ways"

Podcasts

 Stitcher.com - So That Happened!!! Episode 60 - New Year's Evil
 The Movie Review Podcast - New Year's Evil
 cultfilminreview.com - New Year's Evil
 Just Another Horror Podcast - New Year's Evil
 JumpScare! The Horror Podcast, Orlando Horror Society - New Year's Evil
 thatshelf.com - Loose Cannons Episode #52 – New Year's Evil
 Ghost Party Podcast - Episode 37 - New Year's Evil
 Bad Movie Night Podcast - New Year's Evil

References

External links
 
 
 
New Year's Evil (song) on YouTube
New Year's Evil movie trailer on Youtube
Horror Society sing-a-long lyrics

1980 films
1980 horror films
1980s horror thriller films
1980 independent films
1980s mystery films
1980s slasher films
American independent films
American slasher films
Films about television
Films directed by Emmett Alston
Films set in hotels
Films set in Los Angeles
Films set around New Year
Films shot in Los Angeles
Golan-Globus films
Holiday horror films
Mass murder in fiction
Mystery horror films
Punk films
Films produced by Menahem Golan
Films produced by Yoram Globus
1980s English-language films
1980s American films